Fikile Andiswa Masiko is a South African politician who serves as a Member of the National Assembly for the African National Congress. Masiko was appointed to Parliament in June 2019.

Parliamentary career
Masiko stood unsuccessfully for Parliament at the general election on 8 May 2019. However, Nomaindia Mfeketo resigned from the National Assembly of South Africa with effect from 31 May 2019. The African National Congress appointed Masiko as her successor, and she was sworn in on 10 June 2019.

Committee assignments
Committee on Multi-Party Women's Caucus
Joint Committee on Ethics and Members Interests
Portfolio Committee on Women, Youth and Persons with Disabilities

References

External links

Living people
Year of birth missing (living people)
Members of the National Assembly of South Africa
Women members of the National Assembly of South Africa
African National Congress politicians